Ourton is a commune in the Pas-de-Calais department in the Hauts-de-France region of France.

Geography

Population

Places of interest
 The church of St.Vaast, dating from the nineteenth century.
 A sixteenth century manorhouse.
 Remains of an ancient chateau.

See also
Communes of the Pas-de-Calais department

References

External links 
 Official Website

Communes of Pas-de-Calais